In Greek mythology, Thersanon or Thersanor is one of the Argonauts, the crew of the legendary Argo. Born on the island of Andros, Thersanon was the son of the sun god Helios by a woman named Leucothoe; he joined Jason and the other Argonauts in the quest for the golden fleece, kept by King Aeëtes of Colchis, one of Thersanon's paternal half-brothers.

Parentage 
Hyginus names Leucothoe as his mother; according to Ovid, Leucothoe was a mortal princess of Babylon that Helios fell in love with; but when her father discovered the affair thanks to Clytie, he buried Leucothoe alive, and afterwards her dead body was turned into a frankincense tree by Helios. Hyginus assigning them a son might indicate that he knew a very different version of the myth, or perhaps he refers to another woman, such as the sea goddess Leucothea, whom he elsewhere refers to as "Leucothoe" in the same work.

See also 
 Augeas
 Phaethon
 Argonautica
 List of Argonauts

Footnotes

References

Bibliography 
 
 Gantz, Timothy, Early Greek Myth: A Guide to Literary and Artistic Sources, Johns Hopkins University Press, 1996, Two volumes:  (Vol. 1),  (Vol. 2).
 Hyginus, Gaius Julius, The Myths of Hyginus. Edited and translated by Mary A. Grant, Lawrence: University of Kansas Press, 1960.
 Hard, Robin, The Routledge Handbook of Greek Mythology: Based on H.J. Rose's "Handbook of Greek Mythology", Psychology Press, 2004, . Google Books.
 Ovid. Metamorphoses, Volume I: Books 1-8. Translated by Frank Justus Miller. Revised by G. P. Goold. Loeb Classical Library No. 42. Cambridge, Massachusetts: Harvard University Press, 1977, first published 1916. 
 Scott Smith R.; Trzaskoma, Stephen M., Apollodorus' Library and Hyginus' Fabulae: Two Handbooks of Greek Mythology, Hackett Publishing Company, Inc, 2007, . Google books. 
 Smith, William, Dictionary of Greek and Roman Biography and Mythology, London (1873). Online version at the Perseus Digital Library.

Argonauts
Children of Helios
Aegean Sea in mythology